Fishbone Live is the first officially released live album of Fishbone. It contains a 5.1 DVD with companion audio CD of a show filmed April 23, 2008 in Bordeaux, France. It was released worldwide on May 10, 2009.
In 2010, the album was pressed on double picture disc vinyl and is for sale via the band's website.

Track listing

Personnel

Fishbone
Angelo Moore – Vocals, saxophones, theremin
Andre´ "Padre" Holmes – trumpet, Vocals, guitar
Rocky George – guitar
John McKnight – keyboards, trombone, guitar, Vocals
Dre Gipson – keyboards, Vocals
John Norwood Fisher – bass guitar, vocals
John Steward – drums

References

Fishbone albums
2009 live albums
Live video albums
2009 video albums